Tracy Thu Luong is the first woman to own a team in the Vietnam Basketball Association (VBA). Prior to becoming the President of Thang Long Warriors professional basketball club, she was a part Audi Vietnam.

Personal life 
She was born and raised in Ho Chi Minh City. When she was younger, her family went to Hai Duong, her father's hometown, and Hai Phong, her mother's hometown, to visit her grandparents every year. From there, she started to have a connection with Hanoi.

In 2010, she married Mr. Trần Tấn Trung, owner of several luxury brands in Vietnam, such as Audi Vietnam and Tam Son Yacht, among others. They now live with their son and daughter in Ho Chi Minh City and Hanoi.

Education 
She studied at Nguyen Thuong Hien High School, which has a very strong basketball culture. Her passion for basketball started there.

She graduated from Ho Chi Minh City Open University with a bachelor's degree in Accounting and Auditing.

Career 
 

Since 2009, she has participated in running several family businesses, including being a marketing manager at Audi Vietnam.

In 2016, Audi Vietnam became one of VBA's sponsors. She then had the chance to work with the league's management and see their professionalism and much potential.

In 2017, she was given an opportunity to add a new team to VBA and immediately grabbed the chance. By that time, Ho Chi Minh City had already had two teams, so she chose Hanoi, which connected to a lot of her childhood memories, to be the home of VBA's sixth team. With all the ambition and preparation, her team, Thang Long Warriors, became the champion in 2017, right in the first season they joined the league.

In 2018, she established Thang Long Warriors Basketball Academy to train young players and enhance the sports culture in general and basketball culture specifically in Hanoi.

In 2019, she expanded her business in basketball training by establishing a training center in Ho Chi Minh City named Core Focus Training (CFT).

Personal Viewpoint 
She is a feminist and supports gender equality. She believes that nowadays, men and women can handle the same amount of work and deliver the same quality in any field, including sports.

References

1987 births
Living people